Mary Mona Lisi (born 1950) is an inactive Senior United States district judge of the United States District Court for the District of Rhode Island.

Early life and education 

Born in Providence, Rhode Island, Lisi earned a Bachelor of Arts degree in 1972 from the University of Rhode Island and a Juris Doctor in 1977 from Temple University Beasley School of Law.

Professional career 

Lisi began her career as an assistant public defender in the Rhode Island Public Defender's Office, where she worked from 1977 until 1981. She then worked as an assistant child advocate for the Office of the Child Advocate for the State of Rhode Island from 1981 until 1982.

Lisi concurrently worked in private legal practice from 1981 until 1982, when she took a job as Director of the Court Appointed Special Advocate Program for the Rhode Island Family Court. She held that job from 1982 until 1987. Lisi then became Deputy Disciplinary Counsel for the Rhode Island Supreme Court from 1988 until 1990 and Chief Disciplinary Counsel for the Rhode Island Supreme Court from 1990 until 1994, when she was tapped for a seat on the federal bench.

Federal judicial service 

On the recommendation of United States Senator Claiborne Pell, Lisi was nominated by President Bill Clinton on January 27, 1994 to a seat vacated by Francis Joseph Boyle as Boyle assumed senior status. The United States Senate confirmed Lisi in a voice vote on May 6, 1994. Lisi was chief judge of her court from 2006 to 2013. She assumed senior status on October 1, 2015.

References

Sources

1950 births
Living people
Judges of the United States District Court for the District of Rhode Island
Lawyers from Providence, Rhode Island
Public defenders
Temple University Beasley School of Law alumni
United States district court judges appointed by Bill Clinton
University of Rhode Island alumni
American people of Italian descent
20th-century American judges
21st-century American judges
20th-century American women judges
21st-century American women judges